Mayer Anchal is a 2003 Indian Bengali-language drama film directed by Anup Sengupta and produced by Apurba Saha. It is a remake of the 2000 Hindi-language film Jis Desh Mein Ganga Rehta Hain.

Cast
Prosenjit Chatterjee as Bhola Chowdhury
Ranjit Mallick as Janardhan, Bhola's adopted father
Anamika Saha as Mamata, Bhola's adopted mother
Tapas Paul as Manish Chowdhury, Bhola's elder brother
Rachna Banerjee as Rupa, Bhola's love interest
 Mrinal Mukherjee as Raghav Dutta, Rinky's father & retired colonel
Abhishek Chatterjee as Sujoy Chowdhury, Bhola's younger brother
Piya Sengupta as Rinky Dutta
Subhasish Mukherjee as Nandu, Bhola's friend
Dipankar De as Tridip Chowdhury, Bhola's biological father
Shankar Chakraborty as Jaga, main antagonist
Anuradha Roy as Bishakha Chowdhury, Bhola's biological mother
Locket Chatterjee as Naina Chowdhury, Bhola's sister-in-law
 Biplab Chatterjee as Inspector Panda
 Raja Chattopadhyay as Mr. Mallick

Production
Filming of a song sequence took place at Kalimpong.

Music
Ashok Bhadra composed the soundtrack album to the film, which includes songs rendered by Shreya Ghoshal, Kumar Sanu, Shaan and Babul Supriyo.

Release and reception
Mayer Anchal was released on 18 September 2003 and received a highly positive commercial response. One person was killed and twenty-two were injured due to grenade explosions by the United Liberation Front of Assam during a screening of the film on 14 August 2004 at the Uravi cinema hall in Gauripur.

Accolades
Babul Supriyo won the Kalakar Award for Best Male Playback Singer in 2004 for his contribution to the film's soundtrack.

References 

2000s Bengali-language films
Films directed by Anup Sengupta
Bengali-language Indian films